Ingvar Axel Harald Ericsson (31 August 1927 – 14 May 2020) was a Swedish middle-distance runner who specialized in the 1500 m event. He competed at the 1952 and 1956 Summer Olympics and finished eighth in 1952. At the European championships he was seventh in 1950 and fourth in 1954. Ericsson won the national 1500 m title in 1952, 1954 and 1955 and set a new national record in 1956. He was a firefighter by profession.

References

1927 births
2020 deaths
Swedish male middle-distance runners
Swedish male steeplechase runners
Olympic athletes of Sweden
Athletes (track and field) at the 1952 Summer Olympics
Athletes (track and field) at the 1956 Summer Olympics